Alice Beck Kehoe (born 1934, New York City) is a feminist anthropologist and archaeologist. She has done considerable field research among Native American peoples in the upper plains of the US and Canada, and has authored research volumes on Native American archaeology and Native American history. She is also the author of several general anthropology and archaeology textbooks.

Education
She attended Barnard College and Harvard University, from which she received her PhD in Anthropology. While a student at Barnard, she was influenced by James Ford, Gordon Ekholm, and Junius Bird; she worked summers at the American Museum of Natural History Anthropology Department. While at Harvard, she worked with Gordon Willey and Evon Vogt. Many of her influences have been colleagues such as David H. Kelley, Jane Kelley, Jennifer Brown, Robert L. Hall, George F. Carter and his students Stephen C. Jett and Carl Johannesen.

Career
Kehoe taught at the University of Nebraska–Lincoln before teaching at Marquette University, from which she retired in 2000 as professor emeritus. She resides in Milwaukee, Wisconsin. Kehoe has held offices with the American Anthropological Association (AAA), and was president of the Central States Anthropological Society (CSAS).

Kehoe has studied many aspects of Native America and is a strong believer in the theoretical link between the Southeastern Ceremonial Complex (SECC) (of the Native southeastern U.S.) and Mesoamerica (Mexico and Central America). Her principal area of interest is the archaeology and cultures of the northwestern plains of the U.S. While searching for an ethnographic research topic for her dissertation, she happened upon the Saskatchewan Dakota New Tidings Ghost Dance. Kehoe has worked many years with the Blackfeet of the Blackfeet Indian Reservation, an Algonquian Native American group of Browning, Montana, with whom she visits each year to study their history and culture. She has studied Native American spiritual healers ("medicine people") and worked with Piakwutch, "an elderly deeply respected Cree man who served his Saskatchewan Cree community...". She has also worked among Native Americans of Bolivia at Lake Titicaca, where she chewed coca leaves with Native women of the region.

Kehoe has taken some contrarian or controversial positions throughout her career. One of the original proponents of  feminist archaeology, she coedited with Sarah Milledge Nelson one of the first collections of feminist archaeology papers, Powers of Observation in 1990. She is one of the few  in the field with an expansive view of  pre-Columbian transoceanic contacts, summarized in her book Traveling Prehistoric Seas. This interest led to her meeting Richard Nielsen, who asked her to advise on archaeological aspects while testing the Kensington Runestone of Minnesota. Though a majority of relevant scholars have concluded the Runestone is a 19th Century hoax,
nevertheless there remains a community convinced of the stone's authenticity. Kehoe is satisfied the item represents actual runic writing by members of a Scandinavian voyage to North America in the 14th century.

Her interpretation of the Kensington Runestone convinced Kehoe of a different North American history than what is widely taught in schools. She states:

In her many years of teaching and writing, Kehoe has emphasized the importance of critical thinking in looking at anthropology, archaeology, and history, particularly as it pertains to Native America. She speaks of the "limited and biased archaeological record" (2007:personal communication) of the Americas and of how many archaeologists were molded by preconceptions of ancient Amerindians having been "savage" or "primitive" and incapable of having "real" civilizations in European terms. Kehoe minces few words in her distaste for such tunnel-visioned attitudes, stating, for example, "...the massive mounds of the Midwest, most of them larger than any prehistoric mounds in Europe, could not be accommodated in a scenario of virgin wilderness inhabited by Men-Brutes..."

In 2016, Kehoe was honored by the Plains Anthropological Association with its Distinguished Service Award for her "enduring work in Anthropology and Archaeology of the Great Plains" (wording on plaque presented to Kehoe).  Her memoir of her career as a woman in American archaeology, Girl Archaeologist:  Sisterhood in a Sexist Profession, was published in 2022 by University of Nebraska Press.

Works

Nelson, Sarah M. and Kehoe, Alice Beck, eds. (1990) Powers of Observation: Alternative Views of Archaeology. Archaeological Papers of AAA Archaeology Division  2. Washington: American Anthropological Association. 

 Second edition titled North America Before the European Invasions, published 2017 by Routledge, New York.

References

External links
 Biographical sketch of Alice Beck Kehoe at the Scientific American website (December 16, 2008)

1934 births
Scientists from Milwaukee
American archaeologists
University of Nebraska–Lincoln faculty
Marquette University faculty
Barnard College alumni
Harvard University alumni
Living people
Writers from Nebraska
Writers from New York City
Writers from Milwaukee
American anthropologists
American women anthropologists
American women archaeologists
American women academics
21st-century American women